Fair Oaks may refer to:

Places in the United States
Fair Oaks, Arkansas
Fair Oaks, California, in Sacramento County
Fair Oaks, Mendocino County, California
Fair Oaks, San Joaquin County, California, a place in California
Fair Oaks (VTA), a light rail station in Sunnyvale, California
Fair Oaks – Manhattan Manor, a neighborhood in Tampa, Florida
Fair Oaks, Georgia
Fair Oaks, Indiana
Fair Oaks (Natchez, Mississippi), a historic house
Fair Oaks, New York
Fair Oaks, Oklahoma
Fair Oaks, Oregon
Fair Oaks (Aldie, Virginia), a historic farmstead
Fair Oaks, Fairfax County, Virginia
Fair Oaks Mall, a mall in Fairfax, Virginia
Fair Oaks, Henrico County, Virginia

Other uses
Fair Oaks, a 1957 novel by Frank Yerby

See also
 Fair Oak, a town in the borough of Eastleigh, Hampshire, England
 Fairoaks Airport in Surrey, England
 Battle of Fair Oaks & Darbytown Road, an America Civil War battle 
 Battle of Seven Pines or Battle of Fair Oaks, an American Civil War battle